Santu Lussurgiu is a commune in the Province of Oristano, in the region of Sardinia, Italy, located about  northwest of Cagliari and about  north of Oristano.

Santu Lussurgiu borders the following municipalities: Abbasanta, Bonarcado, Borore, Cuglieri, Norbello, Paulilatino, Scano di Montiferro, Seneghe.

Main sights

A rural museum features old tools for cheese production, the manufacture of iron, and related to farm work. San Pietro church, the local parish, is situated in the homonymous square, and the church of Santa Maria degli Angeli is situated near Market square.

A church was built in 1944 in honor of St. Anthony, with two statues: a Madonna, and the other of St. Anthony. There is an outdoor altar, and a path, the Way of the Cross, with statues representing the Passion of Christ.

It is home to a 12th-century Romanesque church, dedicated to St. Leonard.

Culture 

The most known event of Santu Lussurgiu is “Sa Carrela e Nanti”, a horse race on a steep road with masked, paired riders, held annually at some point during the last three days of Carnival. “Cantigos in Carrela” is another event during Carnival, where folk groups from all over Sardinia parade through the streets of the village.

Wildfire 2021

References

Cities and towns in Sardinia